Seca Formation may refer to:
 Seca Formation, Ecuador, a Late Eocene geologic formation in Ecuador
 Seca Formation, Colombia, a Maastrichtian geologic formation in Colombia
 Laguna Seca Formation, a Maastrichtian to Paleocene geologic formation in the United States